Riverside is an unincorporated community in Harrison Township, Wells County, in the U.S. state of Indiana.

It is located on Indiana State Road 116 near the town of Vera Cruz.

Geography

References

Unincorporated communities in Wells County, Indiana
Unincorporated communities in Indiana